Aydar Teregulov (born 27 September 1967) is a Russian bobsledder. He competed in the four man event at the 1994 Winter Olympics.

References

1967 births
Living people
Russian male bobsledders
Olympic bobsledders of Russia
Bobsledders at the 1994 Winter Olympics
Place of birth missing (living people)